Amblyscirtes eos, the dotted roadside skipper, is a species of grass skipper in the butterfly family Hesperiidae.

References

Further reading

External links

 

Hesperiinae
Articles created by Qbugbot
Butterflies described in 1871